The 2014 World Fencing Championships were held in Kazan, Russia, from 15–23 July.

Schedule
The schedule of the competition.

Medal summary

Men's events

Women's events

Medal table

References

External links
 Official website

 
2014
World Fencing Championships
World Fencing Championships
2014 World Fencing Championships
2014 World Fencing Championships
International fencing competitions hosted by Russia
July 2014 sports events in Russia